Lúðvík Geirsson (born 21 April 1959) is an Icelandic politician.

See also
Politics of Iceland

References

External links
 Non auto-biography of Lúðvík Geirsson on the parliament website

Ludvik Geirsson
Living people
1959 births
Place of birth missing (living people)
University of Iceland alumni